Mladá fronta may refer to:
 Mladá fronta DNES, Czech newspaper established earlier as Mladá fronta
 Mladá fronta (company), Czech media group where Miloš Urban worked as an editor